The Real Housewives of Auckland (abbreviated RHOAKL) was a New Zealand reality television series that premiered on Bravo on 22 August 2016.

Developed as an international installment of the American The Real Housewives franchise, it aired one season and focused on the personal and professional lives of several women living in Auckland, New Zealand.

Overview and casting

The Real Housewives of Auckland was first announced on 24 January 2016. The show is the first spin-off, of The Real Housewives of Melbourne.

The cast of the series was announced in May 2016. The reality show will follow Anne Batley-Burton, Michelle Blanchard, Gilda Kirkpatrick, Julia Sloane, Angela Stone, and Louise Wallace. The first season is set to premiere on 22 August 2016.
Executive producer of the series, Kylie Washington, has described the cast of the first season as "people who are the life of the party – the party is them – it's around them, so it doesn't matter where they are, something's always happening." Also reported on the series, "there has been more 'explosive' drama than even Washington anticipated. ... 'We're pretty tongue in cheek with it as well. We know what we are, we're not pretending to be anything else. Already [the Auckland Housewives] are showing that they have the right spirit,'" said Washington. It is also reported that a season 2 looks likely. The first season concluded on 18 October 2016, and did not feature a reunion. The network provided one-on-one interviews with the cast via their Facebook pages, following the final episode.

Shortly after the airing of the first season in October 2016, the production company, Matchbox Pictures, confirmed that there is ongoing discussions for a second installment. The company also went on to say that the first season was a success for the network and that they would like to produce a second season.

On 10 November 2016, it was announced via NZHerald that Bravo played a show reel for 2017 programmes, and The Real Housewives of Auckland was not on it. However, contract information was leaked by NZ Herald, and the cast apparently signed a three-year contract with Bravo. The network has made no announcement if the show has been renewed or cancelled, although the production company Matchbox Pictures would love to bring the show back.

In 2017, Burton said in an interview that her and her cast members had a blast filming season 1. She went on to say she would love to do season 2, but the cast has been left in the dark, not knowing if there will be a season 2. On 6 July 2017, Wallace on Instagram was asked if the show was returning, she replied "No, That ship has sailed", leading to fans thinking the show was cancelled. However Bravo (New Zealand) have issued no statement if the show has been renewed or cancelled. On 12 July 2017 it was announced the show will premiere in the United States in summer. The show premiered in the United States on Bravo on 22 July 2017.

On 28 October 2017 Louise Wallace announced in an interview "If you had asked me  two or three months ago if there would be a second series I would have said no, it's dead in the water. But im not to sure now. Wallace also says if the show gets commissioned for a second season that she is interested however its not something shes hanging out for." The network has made no comments or statements about a second season since the shows airing in August 2016 over a year ago.

On 5 April 2018 It was revealed by a Bravo spokesperson that there is no immediate plans to do a second season, however it is something they would love to do. Cast member Anne-Batley Burton also revealed that she asked somebody that was involved with production, and basically said it's a very expensive show to produce in New Zealand and that they haven't had enough support from the advertising market.

In 2020, the cast (minus Sloane) reunited for a special entitled, Get Housewived.

Timeline of cast members

Taglines
Julia: “If people are talking behind your back, then you're the one in front.” 
Michelle: “I used to strut my stuff on the catwalk, now I'm a model housewife.”
Louise: “I made my money the old fashioned way, I inherited it.”
Angela: “My name may be Stone, but everything I touch turns to gold.”
Gilda: “I never start a fight I can't win.”
Anne: “I'm like a fine champagne, I bubble, I fizz, and I'm the life of the party.”

Controversy 
During the first season's episode 6, titled "Healing Hands" which aired on 20 September 2016, cast member Julia Sloane made a racial slur against fellow cast member Michelle Blanchard, referring to her as "boat nigger". During the broadcast of the episode, the network had cancelled all advertising. Before the episode aired, the network released a statement on the issue saying, "We have taken this matter very seriously. Bravo has given much consideration to ensuring the events are accurately represented, in order that the context of the remark and subsequent events can be fully understood. While the nature of Bravo programming is unscripted, it is a deeply regrettable incident which we are endeavoring to deal with in a responsible manner". Sloane has also made a statement admitting that there was "no excuse for using offensive word" and that she has apologized to Blanchard. In October 2016, it was reported that ratings for the first season continued its decline following the controversy.

Since the racial slur was made and broadcast, Sloane's husband Michael Lorimer has claimed the remark was taken out of context to make his wife look bad and said that the couple also had taken legal action to contact Bravo to have the episode amended. The couple also has hired Deborah Pead, "one of the public relations industry's heaviest hitters".

On 26 September 2016, Race Relations Commissioner Dame Susan Devoy was contacted by The New Zealand Herald and commented, "I do not think that overt racist behaviour is a part of kiwi culture so we all need to call it out when it rears its very ugly head, People like Julia need to understand that using words like that is not how we roll here. That is not us." Since Devoy's remarks, the couple has contacted their lawyers who have claimed Devoy as a bully, however Devoy has since denied those claims.

During the season in episode 8, titled "You Drive Me Crazy" which aired on 4 October 2016, it was revealed that Kirk Hope, chief executive of Business New Zealand, had allegedly left Angela Stone on 12 occasions. Mr Hope was criticised for telling Angela that he wanted to spend more time with "his mates".

Episodes

Broadcast 
In Australia, the series premiered on 28 August 2016, on Arena, the same network that initiated The Real Housewives franchise by Matchbox Pictures. In the United Kingdom, the series premiered on 28 March 2017, on Lifetime. The show premiered in the United States on 22 July 2017 on the American Bravo network.

Reception
The Real Housewives of Auckland premiered with two episodes that aired to a combined total of 632,600 viewers. A spokesperson for the network praised the ratings also revealing that the episodes were number one in the 25-54-year-old female demographic as well as commanding a 19 percent share of female TV viewers. The first half of the first season averaged a total of 339,000 viewers, with episode five airing to a 599,000 viewers. Episode six saw an increase in viewers, rising to a total off 824,000 viewers. Following the controversy in episode six viewership declined with episode nine being to lowest rated episode in the season, airing to 784,000 viewers. Following the decrease in viewership in episode nine; episode ten, that served as the finale for the series, rose to 616,000 total viewers. Despite the slight decline in rating, general manager for the network, Maria Mahoney, has claimed that the ratings have been a success for the network and aided in a 50 per cent increase in peak viewing.

References

External links
 

2016 New Zealand television series debuts
2016 New Zealand television series endings
English-language television shows
New Zealand reality television series
Auckland
Television series by Matchbox Pictures
Television shows set in Auckland
New Zealand television series based on American television series
Race-related controversies in television
Women in New Zealand